Sergio Lugo Barrón (born April 10, 1957, in Mexico City) is a Mexican former professional footballer and manager.

External links
Liga MX 

1957 births
Living people
Footballers from Mexico City
Mexican footballers
Association football midfielders